Lilt is an American company based in Emeryville, California that provides computer-assisted translation software employing artificial intelligence, in more than 70 languages.

History 
Lilt was founded in 2015 by Spence Green and John DeNero. The company executes text, digital, audio, and video translations. Unlike other translation platforms and software, Lilt uses a "human-in-the-loop" system, where a human translator can modify a word when he/she encounters it.

In 2018, the company received Series A funding of $9.5 million, and its Series B was $25 million.

In Lilt’s Series C funding in 2022, it received an additional $55 million. As of April 2022 Lilt has secured USD 92.5m in total funding.

The company has worked with "Five Eyes", the US Air Force, Navy, the FBI, Hudson's Bay Company, Sprinklr, In-Q-Tel (IQT), Intel AI Builder, and Intel Capital. Lilt is helping the US government with translation for the Russo-Ukrainian War.

It helped for translation and early warning during Hurricane Fiona and Hurricane Ian.  In addition, Lilt intends to extend its services for early warning products related to disaster management and early warning systems.

Features 
The Lilt Platform has three components: 

Lilt Translate is a computer-aided translation tool to enhance translator productivity.

Lilt Connect provides content exchange via a translation management system (TMS), a content management system (CMS), and other business systems. This integration approach allows customers to send their content to Lilt for translation, from within the business system they are already using.

Lilt Manage is an enterprise localization management tool that streamlines program workflows with Lilt Manage.

Supported languages 
As of March 2023, the following languages are supported by Lilt.
 Afrikaans
 Albanian
 Arabic
 Bengali
 Bulgarian
 Chinese (Simplified)
 Chinese (Traditional)
 Croatian
 Czech
 Danish
 Dogri
 Dutch
 English
 Finnish
 French
 German
 Greek
 Gujarati
 Hebrew
 Hindi
 Hungarian
 Icelandic
 Igbo
 Ilocano
 Indonesian
 Italian
 Japanese
 Javanese
 Korean
 Malay
 Malayalam
 Marathi
 Norwegian (Bokmål)
 Persian
 Polish
 Portuguese
 Punjabi (Gurmukhi)
 Romanian
 Russian
 Slovak
 Slovenian
 Spanish
 Sundanese
 Swahili
 Swedish
 Tagalog (Filipino)
 Tajik
 Tamil
 Tatar
 Telugu
 Thai
 Turkish
 Turkmen
 Twi
 Ukrainian
 Urdu
 Uyghur
 Uzbek
 Vietnamese
 Welsh
 West Frisian (Frisian)
 Xhosa
 Yiddish
 Yoruba
 Zulu

References

External links 

 Official website

Translation software
 Companies based in Emeryville, California